Melania Gaia Mazzucco (born 6 October 1966) is an Italian author. She is a recipient of the Strega Prize and Bagutta Prize.

Education and career
Mazzucco graduated from the Centro Sperimentale di Cinematografia in 1990 and the Sapienza University of Rome with a degree in History of Modern and Contemporary Literature in 1992. In the 1990s, she wrote several screenplays before publishing her first novel Il bacio della Medusa in 1996.

Her 2003 novel Vita was awarded the Strega Prize. The novel tells the story of two children from a rural Italian village, Diamante aged twelve and Vita aged nine, who emigrate to New York. It was translated into English by Virginia Jewiss.

A film adaptation of Mazzucco's 2005 novel Un giorno perfetto was released in 2008. It was directed by Ferzan Özpetek and was entered in the 65th Venice International Film Festival.

In 2008, Mazzucco published the first of two volumes on the Renaissance painter Tintoretto called La lunga attesa dell’angelo which won a Bagutta Prize. The second volume, Jacomo Tintoretto e i suoi figli: storia di una famiglia veneziana, was published in 2009.

Bibliography

 Il bacio della Medusa (1996) 
 La camera di Baltus (1998) 
 Lei così amata (2000) 
 Vita (2003) 
 Un giorno perfetto (2005) 
 La lunga attesa dell’angelo (2008) 
 Jacomo Tintoretto e i suoi figli: storia di una famiglia veneziana (2009) 
 Limbo (2012) 
 Il bassotto e la Regina (2012) 
 Sei come sei (2013) 
 Io sono con te: Storia di Brigitte (2016)

References

1966 births
Living people
Italian women novelists
Italian women screenwriters
Centro Sperimentale di Cinematografia alumni
Sapienza University of Rome alumni
Strega Prize winners